The Assam Legislative Assembly is the unicameral legislature of the Indian state of Assam. It is housed in Dispur, the capital city of Assam, geographically situated in present Western Assam region. The Legislative Assembly comprises 126 Members of Legislative Assembly, directly elected from single-seat constituencies. Its term is five years, unless sooner dissolved.

History
According to provisions of the Government of India Act 1935, a bicameral legislature of Assam province came into existence in 1937. After the Government of India Act 1935 was passed, it paved the way for the formation of Assam Legislative Assembly, and became a bicameral legislature. The strength of the House was 108, where all the members were elected. The Legislative Council (Upper House) was not less than 21 and not more than 22 members.

The first sitting of its lower house, the Assam Legislative Assembly, took place on 7 April 1937 in the Assembly Chamber at Shillong. Shillong was the capital of the composite State of Assam. It had a strength of 108 members.

However, the strength of the Assembly was reduced to 71 after the partition of India. After Indian independence in 1947, the Assam Legislative Council was abolished and the Assam Legislative Assembly became unicameral.

In the years that followed, Assam was truncated to several smaller states. And over the years, with the changing geographical boundaries and increase in population, the strength of members has changed from 108 in 1952–57 to 114 in 1967-72 (the third Assembly) and by 1972-78 (the fifth Assembly) it had a strength of 126 members.

Members of Legislative Assembly

Speakers of the Assembly
The following is a list of the Speakers of the Assam Legislative Assembly:

Assam Province

Assam State

Deputy Speakers of the Assembly 
This is a following list of the deputy speakers of the assembly.

See also
List of constituencies of the Assam Legislative Assembly
Government of Assam

References

External links
 Assam Lok Sabha Election 2019 Results Website
 Assam Legislative Assembly website

 
State legislatures of India
Politics of Assam
Government of Assam
1937 establishments in India
Unicameral legislatures